The 2014 Alabama Senate elections took place on November 4, 2014, as part of the 2014 United States elections. Alabama voters elected senators in all 35 of the state's Senate districts. Senators serve four-year terms in the Alabama Senate.

Results

External links
2014 Alabama general election results

References

Alabama Senate elections